A hash buster is a program which randomly adds characters to data in order to change the data's hash sum. 

This is typically used to add words to spam e-mails, to bypass hash filters. As the e-mail's hash sum is different from the sum of e-mails previously defined as spam, the e-mail is not considered spam and therefore delivered as if it were a normal message.

Hash busters can also be used to randomly add content to any kind of file until the hash sum becomes a certain sum. In e-mail context, this could be used to bypass a filter which only accepts e-mails with a certain sum.

Initially spams containing "white noise" from hash busters tended to simply exhibit 'paragraphs' of literally random words, but increasingly these are now appearing somewhat grammatical.

See also 
 Cryptographic hash function
 Bayesian poisoning
 Locality-sensitive hashing

References

External links 
searchCIO.com Definitions

Spamming
Random text generation